Thanks, Hank! is a studio album by American country artist Jeannie Seely. It was released in March 1967 on Monument Records and was produced by Fred Foster. The record was Seely's second studio album issued and contained two singles, including the major hit "A Wanderin' Man". The album contained songs written entirely by Hank Cochran, a country songwriter, who was also Seely's husband at the time.

Background and content
Thanks, Hank! was composed of songs written by songwriter Hank Cochran. It was Cochran who first brought Seely to the attention of the Monument label and helped her sign a recording contract. "I have recorded this album of what I consider, not only the best songs in the Cochran catalogue, but some of the best songs in our era," Seely wrote in 1967. The record consisted of 12 songs, many of which had previously been hit singles for other recording artists. The second track, "A Little Bitty Tear", was first recorded by Burl Ives. The twelfth track, "Make the World Go Away", had been a major hit for both Ray Price and Eddy Arnold. The project was produced at the Fred Foster Sound Studio, by Foster himself, in November 1966. The studio was located in Nashville, Tennessee. Foster commented on Seely's vocal delivery in the liner notes of the album and praised the quality of songs written by Cochran. "Thanks Hank and thanks Jeannie. May the circle be unbroken," he said in 1967.

Release and reception

Thanks, Hank! was released in March 1967 in a vinyl record format, containing six songs on each side of the record. In 1972, the album was reissued on the Monument label under the title Make the World Go Away. The album was later released in a digital format in the 2010s. Upon its original release, Thanks, Hank! peaked at number 17 on the Billboard Top Country Albums chart. The project also included two singles. Its lead single, "A Wanderin' Man", became a major hit, peaking at number 13 on the Billboard Hot Country Singles chart. Its second single, "These Memories", was a minor hit, reaching number 42 on the same chart.

The album was reviewed positively in later years. Greg Adams of Allmusic gave the release four out of five stars. "The Pennsylvania-born Seely helped set the pattern for contemporary country artists since she looked like a model and had a very pop-oriented voice, but today she seems like Kitty Wells compared to some of the pure pop that has since passed for country," Adams commented.

Track listing
All songs were composed by Hank Cochran.

Original release

Digital release

Personnel
All credits are adapted from the liner notes of Thanks! Hank.

 Fred Foster – producer
 Ken Kim – photography
 Jeannie Seely – lead vocals
 Tommy Spalding – engineering
 Brent Warner – technician

Chart performance

Release history

References

1967 albums
Jeannie Seely albums
Monument Records albums
Albums produced by Fred Foster